Nicholas James Budgeon (born 28 December 1987) is a former field hockey player from Australia, who plays as a defender.

Personal life
Nicholas Budgeon was born and raised in Launceston, Tasmania.

He plays as a defender, and also specialises in drag flicking.

Career

Australian Hockey League
At domestic level, Nicholas Budgeon has represented both his home state Tasmania, and Western Australia in the Australian Hockey League.

From 2011 to 2013, Budgeon was a member of the Tassie Tigers. In 2016, he transitioned to the WA Thundersticks.

Kookaburras
Nicholas Budgeon made his senior international debut for the Kookaburras in 2013 at the Sultan Azlan Shah Cup.

Following his debut, Budgeon continued to represent Australia until 2015, most notably winning a bronze medal at the 2014 Champions Trophy.

References

External links
 
 
 

1987 births
Living people
Australian male field hockey players
Male field hockey defenders
HC Den Bosch players
HGC players
Men's Hoofdklasse Hockey players
Expatriate field hockey players
Australian expatriate sportspeople in the Netherlands
Place of birth missing (living people)
Men's Belgian Hockey League players